Setnoye is a rural locality in Bolshezhirovsky Selsoviet Rural Settlement, Fatezhsky District, Kursk Oblast, Russia. The population as of 2010 is 33.

Geography 
The village is located on the Verkhny Khoteml Brook (a link tributary of the Usozha in the basin of the Svapa), 98.5 km from the Russia–Ukraine border, 33 km north-west of Kursk, 12 km south of the district center – the town Fatezh, 6 km from the selsoviet center – Bolshoye Zhirovo.

Climate
Setnoye has a warm-summer humid continental climate (Dfb in the Köppen climate classification).

Transport 
Setnoye is located 3.5 km from the federal route  Crimea Highway as part of the European route E105, 28 km from the road of regional importance  (Kursk – Ponyri), 6.5 km from the road  (Fatezh – 38K-018), 2 km from the road of intermunicipal significance  (M2 "Crimea Highway" – Kromskaya), 30 km from the nearest railway halt Bukreyevka (railway line Oryol – Kursk).

The rural locality is situated 37 km from Kursk Vostochny Airport, 154 km from Belgorod International Airport and 230 km from Voronezh Peter the Great Airport.

References

Notes

Sources

Rural localities in Fatezhsky District